Glaydson Marcelino Freire or simply Glaydson  (born June 20, 1979 in Contagem), is a Brazilian defensive midfielder who currently plays for Náutico in the Campeonato Brasileiro Serie A. He also plays as a right back.

Honours 
Internacional
 Copa Libertadores: 2010
 Campeonato Gaúcho: 2011
 Recopa Sudamericana: 2011

References

1979 births
Living people
Brazilian footballers
Sport Club Internacional players
Club Athletico Paranaense players
Cruzeiro Esporte Clube players
Associação Desportiva São Caetano players
Clube Náutico Capibaribe players
Campeonato Brasileiro Série A players
People from Contagem
Association football midfielders
Sportspeople from Minas Gerais